No. 514 Squadron RAF (514 Sqn) was a bomber squadron of the Royal Air Force during the Second World War.

History 

Members of 514 Sqn were awarded 1 DSO, 84 DFCs, one Bar to the DFC and 26 DFMs.

514 Squadron was part of 3 Group, RAF Bomber Command. It operated between September 1943 and August 1945, initially from RAF Foulsham, and then, from December 1943 onward, from RAF Waterbeach in Cambridgeshire. 437 aircrew were killed flying with the Squadron.

Aircraft operated

Squadron bases

Reunions

From 1988 to 2012, the Squadron held an annual reunion in June at Waterbeach Barracks hosted by the Royal Engineers. A service of remembrance was held in the parish church, and the BBMF Lancaster made a flypast over the former RAF airfield.

In 2013, following the barracks' closure, a reunion was held in the village on 15 June with the Lancaster flypast over the Recreation Ground.

In 2015, a reunion was again held in Waterbeach Barracks in a new community building.

Museum
The 514 Squadron Association and the Army established a museum in Waterbeach Barracks in 1985. This museum closed in September 2012, as the barracks closed permanently in March 2013, although the contents have been saved. It expected that the new Waterbeach Military Heritage Museum will return to its building at the Barracks, and re-open in early summer 2016.

See also
List of Royal Air Force aircraft squadrons

References

Notes

Bibliography

 (available from the Museum)

External links

 514 Squadron RAF website - commemorates all who served in the Squadron
 514 Squadron Facebook page
 Squadron history, on RAF website 
 No. 514 Squadron RAF movement and equipment history
 The Wartime Memories Project - 514 Sqn
 Waterbeach Military Heritage Museum
 Squadron histories for nos. 500–520 squadron on RAFweb's Air of Authority – A History of RAF Organisation
 Former Air Gunner tells his story - William MacDonald
 Video about the last flight of 514 Squadron Lancaster A2-C, lost 28 July 1944

Bomber squadrons of the Royal Air Force in World War II
514 Squadron
Military units and formations established in 1943